Malegaon Central Assembly constituency is one of the 288 Vidhan Sabha (legislative assembly) constituencies in Maharashtra state in western India.

It is part of Dhule (Lok Sabha constituency)

Members of Legislative Assembly
 1978: Nihal Ahmed Maulavi Md. Usman, Janata Party
 1980: Nihal Ahmed Maulavi Md. Usman, Janata Party
 1985: Nihal Ahmed Maulavi Md. Usman, Janata Party
 1990: Nihal Ahmed Maulavi Md. Usman, Janata Dal
 1995: Nihal Ahmed Maulavi Md. Usman, Janata Dal
 1999:Shaikh Rashid Haji Shaikh Shaffi, Indian National Congress
 2004: Shaikh Rashid Haji Shaikh Shaffi, Indian National Congress
 2009: Mohammed Ismail Abdul Khalique, Jan Surajya Shakti
 2014: Shaikh Aasif Shaikh Rashid, Indian National Congress
 2019: Mohammed Ismail Abdul Khalique, All India Majlis-e-Ittehadul Muslimeen

Election results

2019 result

See also
Malegaon Outer Assembly constituency
Dhule (Lok Sabha constituency)
Malegaon (Lok Sabha constituency)
List of constituencies of Maharashtra Vidhan Sabha
Legislative Assembly of Maharashtra
 
List of Constituencies of the Lok Sabha
Malegaon

References

Assembly constituencies of Nashik district
Malegaon
Assembly constituencies of Maharashtra